CKVE-FM is a Canadian radio station broadcasting at 88.7 FM in Halifax, Nova Scotia. It is owned by Hubbards Radio Society and airs a community radio radio format. CKVE uses the on-air brand name 88.7 Cove FM

References

External links
www.covefm.com
 

Kve
Kve